Carroll Avenue is a street in Angelino Heights, one of the older neighborhoods of Los Angeles. It consists of Victorian-era houses within a picturesque neighborhood and has served as the backdrop for countless motion pictures.

History
Carroll Avenue is one of Los Angeles' first suburbs, and bears its name well, as it brings the city many tourists and visitors. The houses, or rather Victorian manors, are now used as private homes, as they were in the 19th century. Some of the more well known residents from the Victorian era include: merchant Aaron P. Philips in 1887, real estate agent Charles C. Haskin in 1894, and warehouse operator Michael Sanders in 1887.  One of Los Angeles' first City Councilmen, Daniel Innes, resided at 1329 Carroll Avenue.

The house at 1345 Carroll Avenue was used in the final scene of Michael Jackson's Thriller.

The house at 1329 Carroll Avenue was used as the home for the main characters in the supernatural drama television series Charmed.

The house at 1324 Carroll Avenue was used for the main home in Adam Sandler's 2006 comedy Grandma's Boy.

Historic designations

The entire 1300 block of Carroll Avenue was listed under the National Register of Historic Places in 1976.

Several individual residences along Carroll Avenue have been named as Los Angeles Historic-Cultural Monuments, including the following:
 1337 Carroll Avenue (September 1962)
 1330 Carroll Avenue (May 24, 1967)
 1329 Carroll Avenue (February 3, 1971)
 1345 Carroll Avenue (February 3, 1971)
 1355 Carroll Avenue (February 3, 1971)
 1316 Carroll Avenue (February 3, 1971)
 1320 Carroll Avenue (February 3, 1971)
 1324 Carroll Avenue (February 3, 1971)
 1344 Carroll Avenue (February 3, 1971)
 1325 Carroll Avenue (January 3, 1973)
 1321 Carroll Avenue (July 13, 1977)
 1407 Carroll Avenue (May 3, 1978)
 1411 Carroll Avenue (May 3, 1978)

Gallery of Homes on Carroll Avenue

See also
 List of Registered Historic Places in Los Angeles
 List of Los Angeles Historic-Cultural Monuments in Silver Lake, Angelino Heights, and Echo Park

References

External links

Streets in Los Angeles County, California
Echo Park, Los Angeles
Historic districts on the National Register of Historic Places in California
Los Angeles Historic-Cultural Monuments
Houses on the National Register of Historic Places in Los Angeles
Stick-Eastlake architecture in California
Victorian architecture in California
Roads on the National Register of Historic Places in California